Güímar is the name of a municipality, town and valley in the eastern part of the Spanish island of Tenerife, one of the Canary Islands, and part of Santa Cruz de Tenerife (province).  The municipality extends for 102.9 square kilometers from the mountainous interior to the beaches on the Atlantic, and borders the municipalities of La Orotava, Arafo and Fasnia. Its estimated population is 18,589 (2013). The TF-1 motorway passes through the municipality.

The municipality is famous for its pyramids. It is also the location of the barranco de Badajoz. A portion of its volcanic landscape has been set aside as the Nature reserve of Malpaís of Güímar, its highest point being Montaña Grande.

Name 

The name comes from Guanche and is thought to mean 'angle, corner, nook'.

History 

The first population centre of Güímar originated in the sixteenth century in the neighbourhood of San Juan - also called Güímar de Arriba - near the springs of the Agua and Chamoco ravines. The first buildings were linked to the sugar mill started up by the brothers Juan Felipe and Blasino Piombino or Romano.

Climate

References

External links 

Official Website

Municipalities in Tenerife
Populated places established in the 16th century